Dmitriy Semyonov (born 4 February 1975) is a Russian long-distance runner. He finished sixth in the marathon at the 2006 European Athletics Championships in Gothenburg. He also represented his country at the European Cross Country Championships in 2001 and the IAAF World Half Marathon Championships in 2008.

He won the 10,000 metres national title at the 2001 Russian Athletics Championships, and won the 15K run title at the 2005 Russian Athletics Championships.

International competitions

References

marathoninfo

1975 births
Living people
Russian male long-distance runners
Russian male cross country runners
Russian male marathon runners
Russian Athletics Championships winners